Edlefsen is a surname. Notable people with the surname include:

J. L. Edlefsen (1874–1948), American politician
R. E. Edlefsen (1906–1986), American politician
Steve Edlefsen (born 1985), American baseball player
Tom Edlefsen (born 1941), American tennis player

See also
Ellefsen